Nigatun is an abandoned village in the Ashtarak Municipality of the Aragatsotn Province of Armenia.

References

Report of the results of the 2001 Armenian Census

Former populated places in Aragatsotn Province